Brian Bromberg (born December 5, 1960) is an American jazz bassist and record producer who performs on both electric and acoustic instruments.

Biography 
Bromberg was born on December 5, 1960, in Tucson, Arizona. His father and brother, David, who both played drums, influenced him to take up the instrument himself. At the age of 13, he began seriously pursuing a career as a drummer. However, at around the same time, the leader of his school orchestra steered him towards the upright bass. From then on, he committed to stick to a strict practice regimen and even "tested out of high school early" because of the rigorous schedule he set for himself. Still, plucking away in his basement was only half of the plan. It was integral for Bromberg to gain experience playing in live situations. Thus, he accepted virtually every gig he could get. It was somewhat common for Bromberg to play "five to seven nights a week with several different bands."
In 1979, Marc Johnson, the bassist working for the jazz pianist Bill Evans, heard Bromberg's playing. Johnson later suggested Bromberg to saxophonist Stan Getz, who was in search of a new bass player. Getz took the suggestion seriously, and auditioned Bromberg soon thereafter. Within only six years of picking up the bass, Bromberg found himself at the age of 19 touring internationally with Getz. Other than the thrill of playing with a world-class tenor saxophonist, more opportunities began to reveal themselves to the young bass player, who would go on to work with many big names in the music business and eventually become a producer of various artists in his genre.

In March 2011, Brian partnered with Carvin Guitars to produce a signature model electric bass. The B24 and B25 were based on his own design, which was previously manufactured by Peavey and Dean. In 2014, Carvin rebranded to Kiesel for most new instruments, and the Brian Bromberg model followed suit in 2015.

Releases as a solo artist 
Bromberg's first several albums were in the smooth jazz genre. He began with two records that caught smooth jazz radio's attention: A New Day in 1986 and Basses Loaded in 1988. His third album, Magic Rain (1989) "became the most played album on smooth jazz radio during the first week of its release". Bromberg's fourth record, BASSically Speaking, which is his oldest material re-mastered with some new additions, reached the top 5 on the radio charts and No. 7 on the Billboard sales charts.

With solid following among smooth jazz fans, he put out a straight ahead jazz album, It's About Time, The Acoustic Project. This album reached number four on the mainstream jazz charts in 1991. Bromberg recorded in a trio with Freddie Hubbard and Ernie Watts. After It's About Time, The Acoustic Project he returned to smooth jazz. The label that released Brian Bromberg (1993) went out of business the week of its release.

In 1996, after a short break from recording to design basses for Peavey and touring as a clinician, Bromberg signed with Zebra Records. In February 1998, he released You Know That Feeling, which was recorded with Rick Braun, Joe Sample, Jeff Lorber, and Everette Harp. The album became Bromberg's most successful, later to be topped by Wood, and his first smooth jazz number one record of his career.  You Know That Feeling had three singles in a row that each went to number three on the charts. It spent seventeen consecutive months on the charts, eight months in the top ten, nearly six months in the top five. Bromberg's album was the fifth most-played album from the top 100 albums of the year in smooth jazz. Songs from You Know That Feeling are still regularly played in smooth jazz stations across America. Additionally, in 2003, Bromberg made a record simply titled Jaco in which he performs many of Jaco Pastorius's notable songs.

After You Know That Feeling, Bromberg's albums deviated from his smooth jazz roots. Wood (2002), produced by a Japanese label, was recorded with pianist Randy Waldman and brother David Bromberg on drums. In addition to the solo pieces, Wood and Wood 2 (with drummer Vinnie Colaiuta replacing David Bromberg) contain interpretations of music by Wayne Shorter and Woody Herman. On an even sharper turn from his smooth jazz past, Bromberg released Metal (2005) with drummer Joel Taylor.

Besides playing different kinds of regular basses Bromberg makes also frequent usage of the piccolo bass on his recordings for melodical lines which in fact leads to the absence of guitars on many of his recorded tracks. This unusual instrumentation with the piccolo bass (which is tuned one octave higher than a usual bass) taking over the role of guitars is usually then also emphasized and explained by a statement in the liner notes such as 'There are no guitar melodies or solos on this recording. All guitar-sounding parts are played ... on piccolo bass'.  

As a record producer, Bromberg has produced eight top-ten hits, seven top-five hits, and two number-one hits. Apart from his 300-year-old double bass, he uses Dean, Bob Mick, Mick Donner and Peavey basses with Epifani amplification. He also owns a signature edition Carvin bass.

Releases with the JB Project 
In 2003 Bromberg teamed up with Jazz Fusion drummer Akira Jimbo and formed The JB Project. Their first release Brombo! was published in 2003, featuring Otmaro Ruíz on piano and contained a mixture of classical (Ode To Joy by Ludwig van Beethoven), Jazz standards (Giant Steps by John Coltrane, So What by Miles Davis), Contemporary/Pop (Mambo No. 5 by Pérez Prado, And I Love Her by John Lennon & Paul McCartney) pieces as well as own material. A second release Brombo II!! followed one year later in 2004. It took more than 10 years for their third and latest release Brombo III!!! to follow which got released in 2017. On this third album also piano players Patrice Rushen and Jeff Lorber can be heard in addition to Otmaro Ruíz, who played on all three JB Project albums.

Discography 
A New Day (1986)
Basses Loaded (1988)
Magic Rain (1989)
BASSically Speaking (1990)
It's About Time: The Acoustic Project (1991)
Brian Bromberg (1993)
You Know That Feeling (1997)
Wood (2002)
Jaco (2002)
Brombo! JB Project (2003)
Choices (2004)
Bass Freak Out (2004)
Brombo II!! JB Project (2004)
Metal (2005)
Wood II (2006)
Downright Upright (2007)
Hands (2009)
It Is What It Is (2009)
Bromberg Plays Hendrix (2010)
Compared To That (2012)
In the Spirit of Jobim (2012)
Full Circle (2016)
Brombo III!!! JB Project (2017)
Thicker Than Water (2018)
Celebrate Me Home: The Holiday Sessions (2020)
A Little Driving Music (2021)

References

External links
Official website

American jazz bass guitarists
American male bass guitarists
Smooth jazz bass guitarists
Record producers from Arizona
Living people
1960 births
20th-century American bass guitarists
20th-century American male musicians
American male jazz musicians
Mack Avenue Records artists